Barbara Goldschmidt (1921 - March 7, 2013) was a German-Israeli painter. Born in Germany, she emigrated to Mandatory Palestine in 1938 and attended the Bezalel Academy of Arts and Design. She is the daughter of the communist author Margarete Buber-Neumann and Raphael Buber, and was raised by her paternal grandparents, Martin Buber and Paula Winkler, with whom she lived in Jerusalem with her husband and two children until 1965. She is known for her characteristically bold portraits of women.

References

1921 births
2013 deaths
Jewish emigrants from Nazi Germany to Mandatory Palestine
Artists from Jerusalem
Bezalel Academy of Arts and Design alumni
Israeli portrait painters
20th-century Israeli painters
21st-century Israeli painters
20th-century Israeli women artists
21st-century Israeli women artists